"Hummingbird Heartbeat" is a song recorded by American singer Katy Perry for her third studio album, Teenage Dream (2010). It was written by Perry, Christopher "Tricky" Stewart, Stacy Barthe, and Monte Neuble. Stewart handled the production of the song, while Kuk Harrell produced Perry's vocals. "Hummingbird Heartbeat" was inspired by Perry's boyfriend at the time, Russell Brand. 

Musically, it is a 1980s-styled hard rock song that contains a mixture of elements from rock and electronica. Lyrically, the song compares the feeling of being in love to the speed of a hummingbird's heartbeat. The song received generally positive reviews from music critics, many of whom labeled it as a potential single choice. Upon the release of Teenage Dream, "Hummingbird Heartbeat" charted on the lower regions of the South Korea Gaon International Chart, peaking at 124.

Background and composition

In an interview with YouTube about Teenage Dream in August 2010, Perry revealed that "Hummingbird Heartbeat" was one of the first songs she wrote for the album after she finished her Hello Katy Tour (2009). When speaking about the song, Perry said she first had the idea for the song while she was in her hometown of Santa Barbara, California:

"I was at breakfast when I saw this hummingbird, and the hummingbird was having breakfast as well..... and I don't know if you know this but hummingbirds are supposedly good luck and I was thinking 'How fast does their hearts beat?' , like 'how many beats per minute?' And using that idea for how someone makes you feel, instead of those butterflies, it makes your heart beat really, really fast."

"Hummingbird Heartbeat" is a 1980s-styled hard rock song that contains a mixture of elements from rock and electronica. The song encompasses electric guitars, a piano, and synthesizers in its production. The song also features an acoustic drum kit, unlike the other songs in the album.

Reception

Upon the release of the Teenage Dream album, "Hummingbird Heartbeat" charted on the lower regions of the South Korea Gaon International Chart, peaking at 124. Tom Thorogood from MTV gave a positive review of the song, labeling it a strong single choice and calling it a: "nice companion to Teenage Dream, 'the story of the birds and the bees' is more grown up with proper guitars." Jeb Inge of The Journal called "Hummingbird Heartbeat" the strongest song on the album, while Michael Gallucci of Cleveland Scene declared the song an album highlight and compared it to "Teenage Dream", adding that they were both "top-down bangers." Gary Trust from Billboard compared "Hummingbird Heartbeat" to the first five Teenage Dream singles, and felt that if released as a single, would help Perry become the first artist with six number-one singles on the Billboard Hot 100. In July 2013, Robert Copsey and Lewis Corner of Digital Spy said "a full music video and worldwide push would have been more satisfactory".

From February 20, 2011 to January 22, 2012, Perry embarked on the California Dreams Tour, where she performed "Hummingbird Heartbeat". For most of its shows, the song was the second track performed. It preceded "Waking Up in Vegas" and followed "Teenage Dream".

Credits and personnel
Credits are adapted from the liner notes of Teenage Dream.

 Katy Perry – vocals, writer
 C. "Tricky" Stewart – producer, writer, keyboards, drum programming
 Brian "B-Luv" Thomas – engineering, guitars recording
 Andrew Wuepper – engineering, vocal sound, guitars recording
 Chris "TEK" O'Ryan – engineering, guitars recording
 Pat Thrall – additional engineering, drum programming
 Luis Navarro – assistant engineer
 Steven Dennis – assistant engineer
 Nicolas Essig – assistant engineer
 Randy Urbanski – assistant engineer
 Serban Ghenea – mixing
 John Hanes – engineering for mix
 Tim Roberts – assistant engineer for mix
 Kuk Harrell – vocals producer
 Brent Paschke – guitars
 Michael Thompson – guitars, bass
 Monte Neuble – writer, keyboards
 Josh Freese – live drums
 Steve Churchyard – engineering for live drums
 Stacy Barthe – writer

Charts

References

2010 songs
Katy Perry songs
Songs written by Katy Perry
Songs written by Tricky Stewart
American hard rock songs
Songs written by Stacy Barthe

es:Hummingbird Heartbeat